Sthenias gracilicornis is a species of beetle in the family Cerambycidae. It was described by Gressitt in 1937.

References

gracilicornis
Beetles described in 1937